Micro Golf is a 1981 video game published by Creative Computing Software for the Apple II.

Gameplay
Micro Golf is a game in which 1 to 4 players play miniature golf.

Reception
Bob Boyd reviewed the game for Computer Gaming World, and stated that "One of the best features of this game is that it is not limited to a special age or interest group. It is great for showing people your computer because there aren't hefty rules to learn, you can just start playing, and it is still very challenging for everyone."

References

External links
Review in Creative Computing

1981 video games
Apple II games
Apple II-only games
Miniature golf video games
Video games developed in the United States